Ovidio Lagos (21 July 1912 – 16 September 1970) was an Argentine sailor. He competed in the Star event at the 1956 Summer Olympics.

References

External links
 

1912 births
1970 deaths
Argentine male sailors (sport)
Olympic sailors of Argentina
Sailors at the 1956 Summer Olympics – Star
Place of birth missing